The Overcoat is a 1959 Soviet drama film directed by Aleksey Batalov, based on Nikolai Gogol's story The Overcoat.

Cast
 Rolan Bykov - Akaki Akakiyevich
 Yuri Tolubeyev - Petrovich
 Aleksandra Yozhkina - Petrovich's Wife
 Elena Ponsova - Landlady
 Georgi Tejkh - Important Person
 Nina Urgant - 	  lady of easy virtue	
 Aleksandr Sokolov	- undertaker	
 Rem Lebedev	- assistant chief clerk, birthday	
 Aleksey Batalov		
 Georgii Kolosov - private bailiff
 Nikolai Kuzmin - robber
 Glikeriya Bogdanova-Chesnokova - wife of the birthday man
 Mikhail Ladygin	- 	usurer
 Pyotr Lobanov - quarterly warden
 Vladimir Maksimov	- director	
 Gennadi Voropayev - officer
 Gennady Nilov
 Kira Kreylis-Petrova - servant

References

External links
 

1959 films
Soviet drama films
Russian drama films
Lenfilm films
Soviet black-and-white films
Films based on The Overcoat
1959 drama films
Russian black-and-white films